Collège Laval is a private French-language high school located in Saint-Vincent-de-Paul, Laval, Quebec, in Canada. Today the college has an enrollment of 2000 students, and over 10,000 in alumni. The school is a member of the Quebec-based Fédération des établissements d'enseignement privés.

History
It was established in 1854 and has been under the management of Marist Brothers since 1888.

In 1996 it started accepting female students after it had been a male-only institution since its founding. A school uniform is worn by all students.

External links
Collège Laval 

Marist Brothers schools
Private schools in Quebec
High schools in Quebec
Educational institutions established in 1854
Schools in Laval, Quebec
1854 establishments in the British Empire